Synchlora cupedinaria is a moth in the family Geometridae first described by Augustus Radcliffe Grote in 1880. It is found in Florida, the Bahamas, the Virgin Islands, Guadeloupe, Martinique and possibly St. Kitts and Puerto Rico.

The wingspan is about 14–17 mm.

Subspecies 
Synchlora cupedinaria cupedinaria (Bahamas, Virgin Islands, Florida, possibly St. Kitts and Puerto Rico)
Synchlora cupedinaria guadelupensis Herbulot, 1988 (Guadeloupe, Martinique)

References 

Moths described in 1880
Synchlorini
Moths of Guadeloupe